Monsieur Hawarden is a 1968 Belgian-Dutch drama film directed by Harry Kümel. The film was selected as the Dutch entry for the Best Foreign Language Film at the 42nd Academy Awards, but was not accepted as a nominee.

The film is an adaptation of Filip De Pillecyn's short story Monsieur Hawarden (1935) and Henri Pierre Faffin's novel Monsieur Hawarden (1932), both of which were inspired by an actual nineteenth century diary.

Plot
Meriora Gillibrand disguises herself as a man ('Monsieur Hawarden') to avoid prosecution for murdering her lover fifteen years ago. She is the last living member of a wealthy Vienna family, and has spent the years after the murder traveling Europe with Victorine, her female servant. Her travels provide her with an anonymous cloak that allows her freedom of movement but little peace of mind. Nearing middle age, the guilt and weariness of an empty life has her contemplating suicide as the only way out of her dilemma.

Cast
 Ellen Vogel as Monsieur Hawarden / Meriora Gillibrand
 Hilde Uitterlinden as Victorine
 Joan Remmelts as Rentmeester Deschamps
 Dora van der Groen as Mw. Deschamps
 Xander Fisher as Axel, zoon van Rentmeester
 Senne Rouffaer as Officier
 Marielle Fiolet as Dienstmeisje
 John Lanting as Walter, een bediende
 Carola Gijsbers van Wijk as Corien, een dienstmeisje
 Beppie Blokker as Emma, de kokkin
 Ernie Damen as Hans, een bediende
 Jan Blokker as Man met lantaarnplaatjes

Reception 
The film was not a great commercial success upon its release. It received critical accolades, including prizes at festivals in Chicago, Edinburgh and Hyeres.

See also
 List of submissions to the 42nd Academy Awards for Best Foreign Language Film
 List of Dutch submissions for the Academy Award for Best Foreign Language Film

References

External links
 

1968 films
1968 drama films
1960s Dutch-language films
Belgian black-and-white films
Dutch black-and-white films
Films directed by Harry Kümel
Belgian drama films
Dutch drama films
Dutch-language Belgian films